Meenu Thakur (born 1 July 1972) is an Indian Kuchipudi dance exponent.

About
Recipient of the Uttar Pradesh Sangeet Natak Akademi Award, Meenu has been actively performing for the past 30 years as a Kuchipudi Artiste.

References

Living people
1972 births
Kuchipudi exponents
Indian women choreographers
Indian choreographers
Indian female classical dancers
Performers of Indian classical dance
People from Saharanpur
Women artists from Uttar Pradesh
Dancers from Uttar Pradesh
21st-century Indian dancers
21st-century Indian women artists